Udangudi block is a revenue block in the Thoothukudi district of Tamil Nadu, India. It has a total of 16 panchayat villages.

References 
 

Revenue blocks of Thoothukudi district